The Regional Archaeological Museum (MAR) or Archaeological Museum of the Community of Madrid is an archaeological museum in Alcalá de Henares, Spain, dependent on the regional administration of the Community of Madrid.

History 
Following the creation of the Community of Madrid in 1983 and the transfer to the former of the powers in cultural policies in 1985, a project to create a new regional museum was lined up, as the province of Madrid (already enjoying the National Archaeological Museum) had lacked until that point a provincial museum. The old convent of La Madre de Dios in Alcalá de Henares was chosen as location of the future museum in 1985 and, following works started in 1987, the museum was eventually opened on 25 May 1999.

Collection 
The museum exhibits some paleontological findings such as a skull of cave bear found in Patones in 1971, the biggest ever found in the Iberian Peninsula.

The part of the museum devoted to the Roman period includes a number of epigraphic pieces and an important collection of Roman mosaics from Complutum, the Roman-era Alcalá de Henares.

References 
Citations

Bibliography
 
 

Buildings and structures in Alcalá de Henares
Museums in the Community of Madrid
Archaeological museums in Spain
Administration of the Community of Madrid